My Guilty Pleasure is the second studio album by Swedish electronic duo Sally Shapiro. It was released on 21 August 2009 by Permanent Vacation.

Track listing

Personnel
 Sally Shapiro	– vocals
 Johan Agebjörn – producer (tracks 1–5, 7–11)
 Jon Brooks – mastering
 Anna Sanne Göransson – backing vocals (track 10)
 Roger Gunnarsson – co-producer (tracks 3, 7, 11)
 Evelina Joëlson – backing vocals (track 5)
 Frida Klingberg – photography
 Cloetta Paris – backing vocals (track 3)
 Clive Reynolds – backing vocals (track 3)
 Mathias Schuckert – design
 Skatebård – synth brass pad (track 8)
 SLL – pre-mastering (tracks 8, 10)
 Tensnake – producer (track 6)

Release history

References

External links
 My Guilty Pleasure at Metacritic

2009 albums
Paper Bag Records albums
Sally Shapiro albums